Keith Middle High School is a public secondary school in Orrville, Alabama, part of Dallas County Schools.  It is one of three public high school in the Dallas County Schools System.

References

Schools in Dallas County, Alabama
Educational institutions established in 1923
Public high schools in Alabama
Public middle schools in Alabama
1923 establishments in Alabama